The England national cricket team, organised by Marylebone Cricket Club (MCC), toured India, Pakistan and Sri Lanka from December 1972 to March 1973 and played a five-match Test series against the India national cricket team followed by three Tests against the Pakistan national cricket team. England were captained by Tony Lewis. The Sri Lanka national cricket team was not Test-qualified at that time and played a single first-class match against MCC in Colombo.

Test matches in India

1st Test

2nd Test

3rd Test

4th Test

5th Test

Sri Lanka
Having left India in February, MCC played four matches in Sri Lanka, two of which were first-class including one against the Sri Lanka national team which they won by 7 wickets.

Pakistan

In March, England played three Tests in Pakistan which were all drawn.

References

External links
 Cricarchive
 Tour page CricInfo
 Record CricInfo

1972 in English cricket
1972 in Indian cricket
1973 in English cricket
1973 in Indian cricket
1973 in Sri Lankan cricket
1972-73
1973
Indian cricket seasons from 1970–71 to 1999–2000
Sri Lankan cricket seasons from 1972–73 to 1999–2000
International cricket competitions from 1970–71 to 1975